The Croatian Sheepdog is a dog breed from Croatia.

Description

Appearance
The Croatian sheepdog is of low to medium height and the base color is always black, although there may be very small patches of white on its chest and/or toes.
A characteristic is the short hairs on its somewhat fox-like head and legs. The remainder of the coat is longer and wavy or curly. The height at the withers in both sexes is between 16 and 21 inches and the length exceeds the height by approximately 10%. Traditionally the tail is docked very short but, if undocked, it is carried curled over the dog's back.

Temperament

The Croatian Sheepdog is an alert, agile, keen and intelligent dog with enormous energy and with a strong need for human companionship.  It is healthy, resistant to disease and not expensive to keep.  It possesses a well-developed herding instinct and is an excellent watchdog.

The breed possesses an hereditary predisposition for working cattle. Some farmers affirm that their Croatian Sheepdog knows and will single out every head of cattle by hearing its name.

In the past, the dog was often used to drive herds of pigs to oak woods in autumn, and, in one old document, it states that this versatile breed even herded the horses from Đakovo's stables. It is both a driving and a gathering dog and, depending on whether it comes from a show or working line, its desire to work stock varies. Its approach to the flock may be closer and harder than some other breeds, but is very effective. It may grip but seldom causes any damage thereby.

Activities

Herding instincts and trainability can be measured at noncompetitive herding tests. Croatian Sheepdogs exhibiting basic herding instincts can be trained to compete in herding trials.

History
The Croatian Sheepdog probably originates from dogs which the Croats brought with them in the Migration Period. The oldest found record of a Croatian Sheepdog dates from 1374, in which the Bishop of Đakovo, Peter calls him "Canis pastoralis croaticus".
This breed was most probably developed over several centuries out of the descendants of the so-called “Pfahlbauhund” in Slavonia, Croatia. Professor Stjepan Romić developed the Croatian Shepherd Dog as a breed in the year 1935. The breed was first publicly presented at the first state dog show in Zagreb in 1949. Dr. Otto Rohr wrote the first breed standard in the year 1951, which was then published by the FCI in 1969.

References

External links

http://www.bordercollie.hr/HO&ovce.jpg

http://www.bordercollie.hr/Apolonhead01.jpg

FCI breeds
Dog breeds originating in Croatia
Herding dogs